Achiroides leucorhynchos is a species of freshwater solefish native to Southeast Asia.  It was first described by Pieter Bleeker in 1851. Achiroides leucorhynchos is part of the genus Achiroides.

References 

Fish described in 1851
Soleidae